Forficula laeviforceps is a species of earwig.

References 

Forficulidae
Insects described in 1938